David Graaff is the name of:

Sir David Graaff, 1st Baronet (1859–1931), South African merchant and politician
Sir David Graaff, 3rd Baronet (1940–2015), South African winery owner, grandson of the first baronet